Ministry of Health and Welfare can refer to:

Ministry of Health, Labour and Welfare (Japan)
Ministry of Health, Welfare and Sport (Netherlands)
Ministry of Health and Welfare (South Korea)
Ministry of Health and Welfare (Taiwan)